"Margarita" is a song by American singer and producer Sleepy Brown featuring American recording artists Big Boi and Pharrell Williams. It was produced by Williams and Chad Hugo as The Neptunes. Taken from Brown's third studio album Mr. Brown, the song debuted at #8 on the Bubbling Under Hot 100 Singles chart, which fell off soon after.

Music video
A music video was filmed in Spain in June 2006 and was released in July that year. The video peaked at number 2 on BET's 106 & Park.

Chart positions

References

2006 singles
Pharrell Williams songs
Big Boi songs
Song recordings produced by the Neptunes